The King Hassan II International Cup Tournament was a minor international football competition, which took place in the spring of 1998 in Morocco.

Host nation Morocco, France, England and Belgium participated in the tournament, and matches took place at the Stade Mohamed V, home of Moroccan clubs Raja Casablanca and Wydad Casablanca.

This mini-tournament was arranged as a preparatory exercise for the participating teams of the 1998 FIFA World Cup, taking place two weeks before the tournament, and it was won by France on the basis of having scored more goals. France went on to win the World Cup a few weeks later.

Participating teams 
  (host)

Results

Table 

 *For win on penalties 2 points were awarded; for loss on penalties 1 point.

Statistics

Goalscorers

See also 
1998 FIFA World Cup

References

External links 
 1998 King Hassan II Tournament at rsssf
 King Hassan II International Cup Tournament results & table

1998
1997–98 in Moroccan football
1997–98 in French football
1997–98 in Belgian football
1997–98 in English football